The All Faiths Cemetery is located in Middle Village, Queens, New York. The 225-acre (91 ha) cemetery was established in 1850 by Lutheran pastor Frederick W. Geissenhainer, and incorporated in 1852. Originally named Lutheran Cemetery, it was renamed to Lutheran All Faiths Cemetery in 1990. Approximately 540,000 burials have been conducted at the cemetery since its founding.

History 
In 1847 the New York state legislature passed the Rural Cemetery Act, which allowed non-profit organizations to incorporate and sell burial plots. Seeing an opportunity to provide a lower-cost alternative to existing cemeteries such as Green-wood in Brooklyn, the Rev. Dr. Frederick W. Geissenhainer, the pastor of St. Paul's German Lutheran Church, conferred with representatives of St. Matthew's Lutheran Church (his prior parish.) While St. Paul's decided against investing in this endeavor, St. Matthew's and Dr. Geissenhainer pursued the purchase of land in Queens in 1850. The parcels owned by St. Matthews and Dr. Geissenhainer were held and developed separately; he incorporated as the "Lutheran Cemetery" (although members of all faiths were accepted) on March 22, 1852. Additional acreage was purchased over the next few years, and the Lutheran Cemetery bought the St. Matthew's land in 1868. Burials at the Lutheran Cemetery started at $2.50, and plots could be obtained for $7.00.

In 1990, the name was changed to All Faiths Cemetery "to show accommodation to ALL religious and non-religious patrons". Allegedly due to a lack of funding to maintain grave sites where perpetual care was not paid for, sections of the cemetery are in disrepair.

Alleged Management Issues 
Beginning in 2014, local news media ran stories questioning why some sections of All Faiths Cemetery were in disrepair. One article described “Toppled monuments, sunken gravestones and shattered mausoleum windows…” The chairman of the cemetery’s Board of Directors attributed such conditions to a lack of funds and state law restricting use of perpetual care funds for upkeep of graves where the owners had not paid for such care.

On September 3, 2019 the New York Attorney General filed suit against the directors and officers of the cemetery, alleging that they had "exploited their positions at the Cemetery to draw fees, salaries, and loans from the Cemetery’s charitable assets while ignoring their basic fiduciary obligation to manage the assets under their control for the benefit of the Cemetery and its property." The lawsuit followed investigations arising from an audit by the New York State Division of Cemeteries in 2014. As of February 2022, the case was still making its way through the legal process.

Notable burials and memorials 
 PS General Slocum Steamboat Fire Mass Memorial – commemorates the 1,021 victims of a 1904 disaster, 61 of whom are buried at All Faiths Cemetery.
 John Kissel (1864–1938) – U.S. Congressman.
 John Herman George Vehslage (1842–1904) – U.S. Congressman.
 Frank T. Hopkins (1865–1951) – horseman and endurance rider.
 Carrie Nye (1936–2006) – actress.
 William Johnston "Buffalo Bill" Hogg (1881–1909) – Major League Baseball player.
 Charley Jones (1852–1911) – Major League Baseball player.
 William G. Mank (1831–1887) – Brigadier General in the Union Army in the Civil War.
 William Koelpin (1845–1912) – U.S. Congressional Medal of Honor recipient.
 William Lord (1841–1915) – U.S. Congressional Medal of Honor recipient.
 Charles Stephen Schepke (1878–1933) – U.S. Congressional Medal of Honor recipient.
 Christian Streile (1838–1886) – U.S. Congressional Medal of Honor recipient.
 George Uhrl (1838–1911) – U.S. Congressional Medal of Honor recipient.
 Otto Botticher (1811–1886) – artist, lithographer and Civil War veteran.
 Fred Trump (1905–1999) – father of Donald Trump, the 45th U.S. President.
 Mary Anne MacLeod Trump (1912–2000) – mother of Donald Trump, the 45th U.S. President.

In popular culture
The following films have been shot at the cemetery:
 Rosemary's Baby (1968)
 Man on a Ledge (2012)
 Abigail (2019)

References

External links
 

Cemeteries in Queens, New York
1850 establishments in New York (state)